Dulles Town Center is a census-designated place (CDP) in Loudoun County, Virginia, United States. The CDP is the location of the Dulles Town Center shopping mall, for which it is named. The United States Postal Service considers Dulles Town Center to be a subsection of Dulles, which is itself a subsection of Sterling; none of these locations is an incorporated municipality.

The population as of the 2010 United States Census was 4,601.

History 
In December 1987, Loudoun County officials approved the jurisdiction's first regional shopping mall. The mall was originally planned to be named the "Windmill Regional Shopping Center" but was later renamed to "Dulles Town Center" in 1988. The original expected opening was set for 1993. Dulles Town Center's developer was Lerner Enterprises.

The mall was put on hold until 1994 due to the downturn in the local economy. In March of that year the mall announced it would start construction that spring with plans to be open 1996. With further delays, it wasn't until the summer of 1996 that Dulles Town Center broke ground. The mall opened its first two anchor stores (Hecht's and Lord & Taylor) on November 18, 1998. The ribbon-cutting ceremony for Dulles Town Center took place on August 12, 1999.

Geography
The Dulles Town Center CDP is in eastern Loudoun County. It is bordered to the north by Virginia State Route 7 (Leesburg Pike) and to the west by Virginia State Route 28. Neighboring communities are Sterling to the south and east, Ashburn and Kincora to the west, and Countryside and Cascades to the north.

The community drains westward to Broad Run, a north-flowing tributary of the Potomac River.

Government

Loudoun County Board of Supervisors 
Dulles Town Center is part of the Broad Run District of the Loudoun County Board of Supervisors, represented by Sylvia R. Glass.

Virginia General Assembly 
Dulles Town Center is part of Virginia's 87th House of Delegates district, represented by Democrat Suhas Subramanyam, first elected in 2019, who resides in Ashburn. The CDP is also a part of Virginia's 33rd Senate district, represented by Democrat Jennifer Boysko, first elected in 2019, who resides in Herndon.

U.S. Congress 
Dulles Town Center is part of Virginia's 10th congressional district, represented by Democrat Jennifer Wexton, first elected in 2018, who resides in Leesburg. Dulles Town Center is represented in the United States Senate by Democrat Tim Kaine and Democrat Mark Warner.

References

External links 
Dulles Town Center mall

Census-designated places in Loudoun County, Virginia
Washington metropolitan area
Census-designated places in Virginia